The Carlos de Amberes Foundation (Spanish: Fundación Carlos de Amberes) is a charitable foundation located in Madrid, Spain. It was founded when Carlos de Amberes donated his goods in 1594 to create a hostel; Carlos was a native of Antwerp (Amberes in Spanish), and bequeathed all his property to support people from the Low Countries visiting Spain. The emphasis has now shifted to cultural projects, although the original purpose was assisting pilgrims and people visiting court.

Among others the Foundation is composed of: His Majesty King Juan Carlos, the Belgian Ambassador to Madrid, the President of the Community of Madrid, the Mayor of Madrid, the Head of His Majesty's Office, the President of the Association of Friends of the "Foundation Carlos de Amberes" in Belgium, the Ambassador of the Grand Duchy of Luxembourg to Madrid, the Ambassador of the Kingdom of The Netherlands to Madrid, the President of the Council of State, the Director General of the Spanish Heritage at the Council of Europe, the President of the Spanish Olympic Committee, the Director of the Prado Museum and the Manager of the Royal Tapestry Factory and representatives of Spanish and Benelux institutions and companies.

The Foundation has moved from its original site. It occupies a purpose-built nineteenth-century building which was declared Bien de Interés Cultural in 1994.

References 

Buildings and structures in Madrid
Belgian culture
Bien de Interés Cultural landmarks in Madrid
1594 establishments in Spain
Organizations established in the 1590s
Charities based in Spain